The following is a list of all Federal Telecommunications Institute-licensed over-the-air television stations broadcasting in the Mexican state of Michoacán. There are 41 television stations in Michoacán.

List of television stations

|-

|-

|-

|-

|-

|-

|-

|-

|-

|-

|-

|-

|-

|-

|-

|-

|-

|-

|-

|-

|-

|-

|-

|-

|-

|-

|-

|-

|-

|-

|-

|-

|-

|-

|-

|-

|-

|-

|-

Notes

References

Television stations in Michoacán
Michoacan